The Drava Banovina or Drava Banate (Slovene and Serbo-Croatian: Dravska banovina), was a province (banovina) of the Kingdom of Yugoslavia between 1929 and 1941. This province consisted of most of present-day Slovenia and was named for the Drava River. The capital city of the Drava Banovina was Ljubljana.

Borders
According to the 1931 Constitution of the Kingdom of Yugoslavia,

Also in 1931, the Municipality of Štrigova (now in Croatia) was separated from the Čakovec District and the rest of Međimurje and was included in the Ljutomer District in the Drava Banovina.

Administration
The Drava Banovina was administratively subdivided into 29 counties (called srez):

Aftermath

In 1941 the World War II Axis powers occupied the Drava Banovina, and it was divided largely between Nazi Germany and Fascist Italy, while Hungary annexed Prekmurje and the Independent State of Croatia annexed some smaller border areas.

Following World War II the region was reconstituted, with additional pre–World War II Italian territory (Julian March), as the Federal State of Slovenia, within a federal second Yugoslavia.

List of Bans

The following is the list of people who held the title of Ban (governor) of Drava Banovina:

References

External links

Drava
Modern history of Slovenia
Banovinas of the Kingdom of Yugoslavia
Former states and territories in Slovenia
1929 establishments in Yugoslavia
1941 disestablishments in Yugoslavia
Politics of Yugoslavia